Egypt (EGY) competed at the 2005 Mediterranean Games in Almería, Spain with a total number of 137 participants (113 men and 24 women).

Medals

Gold
 Boxing
Men's Middleweight (– 75 kg): Mohamed Hikal
 Karate
Men's Middleweight (– 70 kg): Mohamed Shemy
Women's Middleweight (– 60 kg): Heba Adly
 Wrestling
Men's freestyle (– 60 kg): Hassan Ibrahim
Men's Greco-Roman (– 60 kg): Ashraf El Gharabaly
Men's Greco-Roman (– 84 kg): Mohamed Mohamed
Men's Greco-Roman (– 96 kg): Karam Gaber

Silver
 Judo
Men's Middleweight (– 90 kg): Hisham Mesbah
Men's Half-Heavyweight (– 100 kg): Bassel El Gharbawy

 Swimming
Men's 100m Backstroke: Ahmed Hussein

 Wrestling
Men's freestyle (– 120 kg): Hisham Mohamed
Men's Greco-Roman (– 55 kg): Mohamed Abou
Men's Greco-Roman (– 74 kg): Ahmed Salem

Bronze
 Boxing
Men's Flyweight (– 51 kg): Mohamed Eliwa
Men's Super Heavyweight (+ 91 kg): Bakr Shouman

 Judo
Men's Half-Lightweight (– 66 kg): Amin Mahmoud
Men's Heavyweight (+ 100 kg): Islam El Shahaby

 Rowing
Men's Coxless Pairs: Mohamed Gomaa and El Bakry Yehia

 Swimming
Men's 50m Backstroke: Ahmed Hussein
Men's 200m Backstroke: Ahmed Hussein

 Wrestling
Men's Freestyle (– 66 kg): Walid El Aal
Men's Freestyle (– 84 kg): Mahmoud Attia
Men's Freestyle (– 96 kg): Saleh Emara
Men's Greco-Roman (– 120 kg): Yasser Sakr
Women Freestyle (– 48 kg): Sahar Zayed

Results by event
 Boxing
Men's Light Flyweight (– 48 kg)
 Ramadan Rezk Alla
Men's Flyweight (– 51 kg)
 Mohamed Eliwa
Men's Bantamweight (– 54 kg)
 Yasin El-Hamid
Men's Featherweight (– 57 kg)
 Tarek Abdel-Aal
Men's Super Lightweight (– 64 kg)
 Saleh Khoulif
Men's Welterweight (– 69 kg)
 Mohamed Mohamed
Men's Middleweight (– 75 kg)
 Mohamed Hikal
Men's Light Heavyweight (– 81 kg)
 Ramadan Yasser
Men's Heavyweight (– 91 kg)
 Ahmed Hefny
Men's Super Heavyweight (+ 91 kg)
 Bakr Shouman

See also
 Egypt at the 2004 Summer Olympics
 Egypt at the 2008 Summer Olympics

References
 Official Site

Nations at the 2005 Mediterranean Games
2005
Mediterranean Games